The 1956 Indiana gubernatorial election was held on November 6, 1956. Republican nominee Harold W. Handley defeated Democratic nominee Ralph Tucker with 55.61% of the vote.

General election

Candidates
Major party candidates
Harold W. Handley, Republican, Lieutenant Governor under George N. Craig
Ralph Tucker, Democratic, Mayor of Terre Haute

Other candidates
J. Ralston Miller, Prohibition
Merle N. Miller, Socialist Labor

Results

References

1956
Indiana
Gubernatorial